Carpatolechia intermediella is a moth of the family Gelechiidae. It is found in Spain.

References

Moths described in 1999
Carpatolechia
Moths of Europe